The 2021 Liga 3 Central Sulawesi will be the sixth season of Liga 3 Central Sulawesi as a qualifying round for the national round of the 2021–22 Liga 3.

Pestu Touna were the defending champion.

Teams
There are 17 teams participated in the league this season.

Venue
All matches will held in Gawalise Stadium, Palu.

Group stage

Group A

Group B

Final round

References

Liga 3
Sport in Central Sulawesi